In total, 76 male footballers to date have scored at least 50 goals with their national team at senior level, according to FIFA documents and RSSSF statistics. Since October 2021, the International Olympic Committee (IOC) has also been publishing an according list, but only of the top 10. Cristiano Ronaldo of Portugal holds the all-time record with 118 international goals.

Unofficially, if matches against non full A-level national teams and against non national teams are counted, Mokhtar Dahari holds the record, having amassed 125 goals in 167 matches with the shirt of Malaysia.

Brazil and Hungary hold the record of having the most players to have scored 50 or more international goals with four each. England, Iraq, Japan, Kuwait, Malaysia and Thailand each have three players who have achieved the feat. The Asian Football Confederation (AFC) has the highest number of footballers who scored at least 50 international goals, with 30 players.

Bader Al-Mutawa of Kuwait has played the most matches so far to score 50 international goals. He scored his 50th goal during his 155th international appearance, in a hat-trick against Myanmar on 3 September 2015, in a 2018 FIFA World Cup qualification match.

History 

The first player to score 50 international goals was Imre Schlosser of Hungary. He achieved the feat when he scored a brace (two goals) in a 6–2 victory against Austria on 3 June 1917. In total, he scored 59 international goals in 68 matches, playing his last match on 10 April 1927. He remained the highest international goalscorer for 26 years, until his fellow countryman Ferenc Puskás broke the record in 1953. Puskás was the third player, after Poul Nielsen of Denmark, to achieve 50 goals in his international career. Nielsen achieved this feat on his 36th cap against Sweden in the 1924–28 Nordic Football Championship on 14 June 1925 and scored 52 goals in just 38 matches in his international career. Puskás netted his 50th goal on 24 July 1952, when he scored a brace in the semi-final match against Turkey at the 1952 Summer Olympics. However, Vivian Woodward scored 75 goals in 53 matches considered official internationals by the opposing sides, which would make him the first footballer to score 50 or more international goals, ahead of Imre Schlosser, and was the fastest to achieve the feat, scoring his 50th goal in his 32nd official international match, with a four-goal haul against Hungary on 31 May 1909.

Puskás overall scored 84 goals in his international career, and remained the highest international goalscorer for 24 years following his 84th goal in 1956 against Austria, until Mokhtar Dahari of Malaysia broke the record in the Merdeka Tournament after scoring his 85th goal on 27 October 1980 against Kuwait and he went on to score 89 goals for his country in 142 international appearances. In 2003, Ali Daei of Iran broke the record after scoring his 90th goal against Lebanon.

Daei also became the first player to score over 100 goals in international football, ending his career with 109 in total. His 100th goal came on 17 November 2004, when he scored a four-goal haul against Laos in a 2006 FIFA World Cup qualification match. However, the first player from Asia to reach 50 international goals was Malaya's Abdul Ghani Minhat. Furthermore, he was also the first player from outside Europe to achieve it. He achieved the feat on 15 December 1961 against Thailand and he went on to score 58 goals in 57 international appearances for his country which is 1.02 per match, making him one of the most prolific players in the world. Just two years after Puskás' scored his 50th goal, his teammate Sándor Kocsis did the same on 19 September 1954, in a friendly match against Romania. He became both the fourth player and the fourth European to achieve the feat. He went on to score a total of 75 goals in 65 matches in international football. Cristiano Ronaldo of Portugal is the only other player apart from Daei to score 100 international goals, as well as the first European to achieve the feat. He reached the milestone after scoring a brace against Sweden in the 2020–21 UEFA Nations League on 8 September 2020.

Pelé of Brazil was the first player from South America to score at least 50 international goals. He attained this in a friendly match against the Soviet Union on 21 November 1965, and went on to score 77 international goals in 92 matches. Malawi's Kinnah Phiri was the first player from Africa, and also the youngest player, to score 50 international goals. He scored his 50th goal in a friendly match against Sierra Leone on 6 July 1978, aged 23 years, 8 months and 6 days. Stern John of Trinidad and Tobago was the first player from North America to score 50 international goals. He scored 70 goals in 115 matches, with his 50th goal coming in a friendly match against the Dominican Republic on 13 June 2004.

By player 

 

Players in bold are still active at international level.

By nationality 

*NB: The term "nationality" in this section refers to the nation(s) the player represented (the national team(s) he played for), not to the nationality-ies and/or citizenship(s) he holds.

By confederation 

No OFC player has scored 50 goals in full internationals. The current record holder is Solomon Islands player Commins Menapi, with 34 goals in 36 matches between 2000 and 2007.

Footnotes

See also 

 List of women's footballers with 100 or more international caps
 List of top international men's football goalscorers by country
 List of men's footballers with 100 or more international caps
 List of men's footballers with the most official appearances
 List of men's footballers with 500 or more goals
 List of goalscoring goalkeepers
 List of hat-tricks

References

External links 

international goals
Men's over 50 goals
Career achievements of association football players